Giorgio Prosperi (17 February 1911 – 21 January 1997) was an Italian screenwriter. He wrote for 46 films between 1948 and 1967.

Selected filmography
 The Angel Wore Red (1960)
 Everyone's in Love (1959)
 Estate Violenta (1959)
 Arrivederci Roma (1957)
 Senso (1954)
 Maddalena (1954)
 I Chose Love (1953)
 The Angel of Sin (1952)
 The Overcoat (1952)
 Tomorrow Is Another Day (1951)
 Without a Flag (1951)
 The Lovers of Ravello (1951)

References

External links

1911 births
1997 deaths
20th-century Italian screenwriters
Italian male screenwriters
Writers from Rome
20th-century Italian male writers